Nicholas Presciutti (born 14 December 1993) is a water polo player from Italy. He was part of the Italian team at the 2016 Summer Olympics, where the team won the bronze medal.

See also
 List of Olympic medalists in water polo (men)

References

External links
 

1993 births
Living people
Water polo players from Rome
Italian male water polo players
Water polo centre backs
Water polo players at the 2016 Summer Olympics
Medalists at the 2016 Summer Olympics
Olympic bronze medalists for Italy in water polo
Water polo players at the 2020 Summer Olympics
World Aquatics Championships medalists in water polo
21st-century Italian people